Erin go Bragh GAA are a Dublin-based Gaelic Athletic Association club based in Clonee, Littlepace/Castaheaney/Ongar district in Dublin 15. The club currently fields one team in junior football (AFL11 North County and Junior E Championship), one junior hurling team (AHL 8 and Junior E Championship) and one camogie team. They also have a boys and girls juvenile section fielding from Under 8-minor in football, hurling and camogie. There is also a club of the same name based in Warwickshire, England.

History

Early days
1887-1917
The name Erin go Bragh (meaning "Ireland forever") in Dublin GAA goes back as far as 1887. The club was founded in 1887 in Clonsilla. It was one of 120 clubs affiliated in Dublin in 1888. William Rogers was listed as club secretary, Paddy Dunne was captain and Laurence Warren vice-captain of the football team. Tommy Murphy, a blacksmith originally from Kildare, was captain of the hurling team with L. Rooney vice captain. The team played their games in a field owned by Paddy Dunne competing until 1890 where sadly like many GAA clubs in Dublin at the time it disbanded.

The club name is rarely found afterward but was re-organised on several occasions. The club competed in the Sunday Junior Football League from 1904 to 1909. The name of the club was often misspelt in results and fixtures section of papers, most commonly as Eire go bragh and at other times as Erin go Brath. The club had two football teams, one in the Junior B Division and the second in an Under Junior Division in 1905 and 1906. Erin go Bragh were Junior league runners up in 1906 defeating Stars of Erin at Jones Road (now Croke Park)for the runners up medals. Re organisation of the league structures in 1907 meant that the club's first team competed in the Intermediate Division and their second team in the Junior C Division. Erin go Bragh was one of ten clubs with representation in an inter-league Dublin junior football team who played Cork in a challenge at Jones Road in 1907. Thomas C. Murphy of Erin go Bragh was the first ever Dublin inter-league captain and Stephen Lynch also played for Dublin against Cork and later Louth. Other Erin go Bragh players to have played on the Dublin inter-league team were Hennessey (first name unknown) and Francis Scully, originally from Kildare. The club competed until 1909, when it suddenly disbanded and despite efforts to revive the club in 1910, Erin go Bragh remained absent from the field of play until 1917.

1917-1943
The club was re organised in 1917, fielding a single team at Junior level and in 1918 expanded to two teams: one at junior, the second at minor level.

In 1919 Erin go Bragh fielded a single team but also began competing in cross country (their involvement coinciding with the recent revival of athletic in GAA which had lapsed over the years). Erin go Bragh competed in the Dublin County Board Novice race in 1919, 1921 and 1922 and the Dublin Cross Country championship of 1922. M. J. Kennedy of Erin go Bragh won the 1919 Novice race before moving to Dublin City Harriers and 1919 was his only year with Erin go Bragh. He went on to compete in many Athletic events throughout Ireland winning many titles in 440 and 880 yard races.
In 1920 the team again fielded a junior football team but failed to complete the season after conceding three games. T. C. Murphy of Clonsilla son of Thomas Murphy  who was captain of the Erin go Bragh hurling team at the club's foundation was elected as the first-ever chairman for the Dublin Junior Board. Thomas Murphy was heavily involved in Dublin GAA in earlier years and was a referee in many League games.

Erin go Bragh won the County Dublin Novice Cross Country race in 1921 and also held an invitational five-mile race, starting at the court house in Blanchardstown. The club fielded a Junior and schools football team and for the first time since 1890 a hurling team. The club was absent from the field of play in both hurling and football in 1922 but did compete at cross country before sadly disbanding once again in late 1922 early 1923.

1943-1985
The club name is rarely seen afterwards in papers. Erin go Bragh reappeared in 1943 and they were one of 6 new teams to be re-organise or founded at the end of 1943 for the forthcoming 1944 season. They played their games on the Porterstown Road just down from where Thomas C. Murphy lived and today where St. Mochtas soccer club now play. They competed until around the 1950s winning the Junior A league in 1945 and were Junior League runners up, losing by one point to Parish Gaels who went on to win the Intermediate football Championship the following year. Thomas C. Murphy, son of Erin go Braghs first hurling captain and founding member Thomas Murphy and one Erin go Braghs first inter county players and later chairman of the Dublin Football League and Junior Board died in St. Kevins hospital (now St. James Hospital) in 1946. The club continued competing until around 1947 disbanding again. The club was reorganised in the 1950s by the parish priest of Porterstown Father Redmond, Paddy Downing of Clonsilla and James Lynam of Porterstown. The club only played at juvenile level with a single team winning a minor league in 1963. The club's current president Ellis Poynton was a member of that team. They disbanded again shortly after with most of the team joining St. Brigids and others joining a club called Maurice O'Neills who played their games in the Phoenix Park. Erin Go Bragh played their games in the colours of green and red at this time.

Re-emergence of Erin go Bragh 1986
The name Erin Go Bragh emerged once again in 1986 in Dromheath. The club was reorganised by a number of people who left St. Brigids including Cecil Stephens, Robert Stephens, Martin Stephens and Ollie Shanley. The first chairman was Joe Gerathy, secretary Jim Whittaker and treasurer K. Williamson. The club started out at juvenile level with 3 teams at Under 10, Under 12 and at Under 14. A junior football team was also founded and played in the then Junior Division 2. Their first game was against St. Brigids B team and attracted a crowd of around 250 people. They reached the quarter finals of the junior A football championship in their second year however endured several seasons of relegation as the years progressed. The club moved to Porterstown Park in Clonsilla and expanded at under age level with teams at Under 16 and minor level in 1996. The club was once again on the move in 2003 relocating to Clonee, Littlepace/Castaheaney. In September 2005 Fingal County Council allocated football pitches to the club. Former GAA President Mr. Sean Kelly formally launched Erin Go Bragh GAA Club in Littlepace/Castaheany on 23 November 2005. The Clonee, Littlepace/Castaheaney area was identified as having a large and growing population yet no GAA presence. There was a wide expectation that the club will grow in the coming years and as a result a three strategic year plan (2006–2008) was devised and implemented .

The club held its first ever Dinner Dance in October 2008 reflecting the club's steady growth within Littlepace/Castaheaney and the surrounding area . For the first time the club also gave out club player of the year awards in Gaelic Football (Men's and Ladies'), Hurling and also a Club Person of the Year award and Life Time Achievement Awards. The club also unveiled its new crest.

Erin go Bragh celebrated 125 years of the GAA on 10 May 2009, holding a Lá na gClub (Club Day) in Hazelbury Park. Members of the club and people from the locality, young and old were invited down to participate in juvenile and adult games of football and hurling. The club also held a puck fada and cic fada competition, a bonny baby competition, penalty competition. The pitch was blessed by local priest Father Eugene McCarthy before the day got underway. The club announced that approval in principle had been secured for the placing of temporary juvenile dressing room facilities on a site adjacent to Mary Mother of Hope, National School, Littlepace in 2009. The club featured in a newscast by local channel City TV during its juvenile hurling summer camp in August 2009. The club launched a monthly newsletter in September 2009.

On Saturday 30 January 2010, the club installed temporary changing facilities in the grounds of the Mary Mother of Hope Primary school. The dressing room were officially opened by GAA president Christy Cooney and blessed by Father Eugene McCarthy on 9 May which was also Lá na gClub. On the week of La na gClub the club held a week-long mini leagues series for all ages in both Hunters Run and Hazelbury Park pitches with the finals on the Sunday in Hazelbury Park. An adult blitz was also held on the Saturday in Hazelbury park with the final on the Sunday. On the Sunday itself there was also a puck fada and cic fada competition, a bonny baby competition, penalty competition, a fun run event and tug of war. La na gClub in 2010 was a much larger event than that of 2009. Former Erin go Bragh Footballer Michael O'Riordan was named as manager of the Kildare hurling team on 4 October 2010. However his term was a short one. A separate executive committee was set up to look after the development, growth and administration of ladies Gaelic football and camogie. Kevin Kenny was elected as chairman and John Whelan secretary. The Under 14 girls won the Division 4 Championship and were runners up in their division in the Camogie league.

Cecil Stephens who served as chairman since 1986 stood down at the club's AGM on 14 December 2010 and was succeeded by George Burke while Pat Keenan who had been vice chairman for the same amount of time also stood down and was succeeded by Sean Flood. John Kinsella took over as secretary from George Burke. Erin go Bragh featured in the Dublin GAA yearbook 2011. The article was written by club P.R.O. Keith Edgely and was one of thirty clubs to feature in the book. The club also changed their jersey design staying with the same colours of green and white and changing from Malley Sports to O'Neills. The annual La na gClub was held once again on 8 May. The Annual Street League competition was run the week of Lá na gClub at Hunters Run with the day itself held in Hazelbury Park on Sunday. The club was allocated a new pitch in Beech Park located beside Clonsilla train station. The Under 15 girls won their football league defeating Na Fianna in a playoff in Hunters Run on 3 September 2011. The Junior football team gained promotion from Division 8 to Division 7 and reached the Junior D Football Championship Final. At Underage, the Under 11s were runners up in their football league as were the Under 12s who also won the Leinster Hurling tournament. The Under 13 and 15 girls reached their Shield finals with the Under 15s winning and the Under 13s finishing as runners up. The club held its second ever Dinner Dance on 5 November in The Park Plaza, Tyrellstown with 120 people attending. The ladies section were awarded small club of the year by the Dublin Ladies Gaelic Football board at their annual dinner dance in November 2011.

The club once again featured in the Dublin GAA yearbook 2012 with Keith Edgely writing the article. The club's adult representation in Gaelic Football increased to two football teams. Garreth Dalton was appointed manager of the hurling team. Benjy Stephens and George Burke took charge of the 2nd Football team. The club played their games for the 2012 season in Hazelbury Park, Hunters Run and St. Catherines Park. The club held it annual La na gClub in Hazelbury Park the second weekend of May. Erin Go Bragh appeared in an article in the Evening Herald. Erin Go Bragh are one of three clubs along with St. Brigids and Tyrellstown in Dublin 15 who do a weekly radio show together on Monday nights on local radio station 92.5 Phoenix FM called 'The Throw In'. The show covers all goings on at the three clubs. The radio station has a 25% listenership in Dublin 15. The Under 14 camogie team won their division in Feile. They beat Commercials 0-01 to 0-0. The A football team reached the quarter finals of the Junior D Football Championship losing to Ballyboughal 1-10 to 0-8. For the first time in the club's history the hurling team reached the final of the Junior E Hurling Championship. They played St. Marks in the final in O'Toole Park, losing 3-13 to 4-4 on 14 October. The weekend of 21 and 22 October was an extremely successful one for the club. The Under 11, Under 12 boys won their football leagues. The Under 11s bet local Dublin 15 rivals St. Peregrines while the Under 12s had to come from behind to beat O'Tooles by a single point, 1-4 to 1-3 in Hazelbury Park. The Under 14 Girls won the Division 5 Football Championship beating Foxrock/Cabinteely in Clonshaugh. The club held their 3rd dinner dance in the Carlton Hotel, Tyrellstown on 24 November.

The club's AGM was held on 13 December. Club treasurer Tom Madigan and PRO Keith Edgely who both held the positions since around 2006 stood down having served the maximum 5 years for the positions. Both remain involved on the executive committee. Pat Keenan who was Irish officer and been involved in the club since 1986 stepped down from the executive committee. The club once again had success at juvenile level in 2013 with their Under 14 camogie team winning the Division 5 feile and Under 14 boys football team winning feile Division 8. The ladies minor football team won the Division 4 Shield beating local rivals Castleknock in the final. At adult level there has been mixed success. The hurling team had a very successful year winning Division 9 and reaching the quarter finals of the junior D hurling championship. Kevin Larkin was a member of the Division 3A winning Fingal hurling team. Colin Caughan, David Kennedy also trained with the team early in the year. However the football section of the club experienced a difficult year going from fielding two teams to one and were relegated from Division 7.

Garret Dalton stepped down as hurling manager for 2014 with Karl Johnson taking over. Garret remained on as a player. At the AGM Shane Fagan who had taken over from Keith Edgely as club PRO stepped down with Karl Scanlon taking over. Keith Edgely, Brian Padden and Alan McHugh all stepped down from the executive with Gavin Brady the only new member. Benjy Stephens was appointed the club's football manager for 2014. For the first time since 2008 the club will field a ladies football team in 2014 and for the first time in the club's history an adult camogie team. Eilis Poynton stepped down as club president with Pat Keenan taking over. The Under 12 second team won division 9 of the football league. The under 13 ladies football team won the division 4 cup final while the under 16 ladies football team won the division 4 shield. The under 13 camogie team where division 5 runners up and won the D championship shield. The under 16 camogie team won the C championship shield. For the second year in a row the hurling team won their league. They went the league season unbeaten winning 12 games and drawing one. The club held a 5 kilometer run/fun run/walk as part of their fund raising activity. Two members of the ladies camogie team were members of the under 16B Dublin team who won Leinster.

One of the founding members, Robert Stephens, died in 2015. In his memory the Stephens family set up a young sports person of the year award. John Kinsella took over from George Burke as chairman. George completed a five-year term as the clubs chair person. Paul Gilmartin replaced John as club secretary with Tom Madigan becoming club treasurer. The club joined with Westmanstown Gaels at under 15 football to form St. Catherines. This was expanded in 2016 with St. Catherine fielding football teams at under 15, 16 and minor and also an under 16 hurling team. The junior football team reached the junior E football championship semi final. The 2015 football feile were runners up in their competition. The clubs under 12, 13, and 15 hurling teams were runners up in their leagues. The under 14 camogie team won their championship while the under 16 team were runners up.

Club crest

With the club going from strength to strength in underage and Junior level since their arrival in the Clonee, Littlepace/Castaheaney are in 2008 it was decided that the club needed a new crest  To this end they held a competition for the children in the local primary school where they had to design a crest for their local GAA club. The competition was won by nine-year-old Kieran Murray.

Club awards

2008
Life Time Achievement Award: Cecil Stephens and Pat Keenan
Gaelic Footballer of the Year (Men): Jim Kelly
Gaelic Footballer of the Year (Women): Dorothée Moreau
Hurler of the Year: Karl Johnson
Clubman of the Year: Martin Carroll

There were no club awards in 2009.

2010
Gaelic Football Player of the Year (Men): Cillian Meade

2011
Life Time Achievement Award: Elish Poynton
Clubman of the Year: Martin Carroll
Gaelic Footballer of the Year: Conor Quinn
Hurler of the Year: Colin Gaughan
Juvenile Mentors of the Year: Myles McDonnell, Karl Scanlon

2012
Clubman of the Year: John Kinsella
Gaelic Footballer of the Year (1st Team): Colm Anderson
Gaelic Footballer of the Year (2nd Team): Jerry O'Sullivan and Danny Doohan
Hurler of the Year: Martin Duffy
Manager of the Year: Garret Dalton
Juvenile Mentors of the Year: Karl Johnson, Donal Cashin (Under 11 boys), Sean Flood, Paul Crowe, Tom Bowe, Peter Ennis (Under 12 Boys)
Team of the Year: Under 14 Girls (mentors: Jason Forbes, Brian and Maria Padden)

2013
Clubman of the Year: Dave Bradish
Gaelic Footballer of the Year: Simon mcCabe
Hurler of the Year: Aidan Watson
Manager of the year: Karl Johnson
Team of the year: Adult Hurlers

2014
Clubperson of the year: Maria Padden
Gaelic Footballer of the Year: Alan Conferee
Players Gaelic Footballer of the Year: Pat Murphy
Hurling Player of the Year: Damien O'Donoghue
Players Hurling Player of the Year: Robert Watson

2015
Clubperson of the year: Martin Carroll
Gaelic Footballer of the Year: Mick Moroney
Players Gaelic Footballer of the Year: John McLeod
Young Gaelic Footballer of the Year: Andrew Jones
Hurling Player of the Year: David McDermott
Players Hurling Player of the Year: Martin Duffy

2017
Clubperson of the year: Karl Scanlon
Gaelic Footballer of the Year: Daniel Stephens
Players Gaelic Footballer of the Year: Ray Nolan
Players Young Gaelic Footballer of the Year: Cathal Burke
 Young Gaelic Footballer of the Year: Jack Daly
Hurling Player of the Year: Patrick Henderson
Players Hurling Player of the Year: Jason Nolan
Young Hurler of the Year: Alex O’Neill

Club administration

Committee officers
President: Pat Keenan
Chairman: John Kinsella
Vice Chair: 
Secretary: Paul Gilmartin
Treasurer: Tom Madigan
Registrar: Finbarr Barrett
Public Relations Officer: Julie O'Brien
Children's Officer: Naomi UiConghaile
Irish Officer: Mick Moroney

Other committee members
Maggs McGrath
David Shakeshaft
Ronan Bevan
Vincent McCabe

Past and Present Chairmen
1986-1988  Joe Gerathy
1988- 1998 Cecil Stephens
1998- 2000 Pat Keenan
2001-2010: Cecil Stephens
2010–2015: George Burke
2015–present: John Kinsella

Past and Present Vice-Chairmen
1986-1989  Robert Stephens
1989-1992  Martin Stephens
1993-2010: Pat Keenan
2010–2014: Sean Flood
2014–2016: John McLeod
2017–present: Ronan Behan

Football
The men's football team dates back to the club's foundation. They were junior league runners up in 1906, 1945. They won a minor league in 1963. They finished in 10th position in AFL 8 in 2008 and reached the second round of the Junior C Football Championship.

In 2009 they once again reached the second round of the Junior C Championship exiting after a one-point defeat to St. Marks in a replay having defeated Round Towers, Clondalkin in round one. They finished 13th in AFL 8 in 2009 and 2010. The football team were defeated by Naomh Fionnbarra in the second round of the Junior Football C Championship having received a bye if the first round in 2010. The team finished in 10th position in AFL 8, winning 5, drawing 1, and losing 8 games in the 2010 season.

On 20 October 2010 the club announced that Donal Quinn would be taking over for the 2011 season. They reached the semi finals of the Murphy Cup losing to Ballinteer St. Johns in a replay. They gained promotion to Division 7 from Division 8 finishing second in the league. In the Junior D Football Championship Erin go Bragh reached the final defeating Round Towers of Lusk in the first round, Innisfalis in the second round, Castleknock in round three, St. Pats of Donabate in the quarter finals and Wild Geese in the semi final. The final held in O'Toole Park in Crumlin was against St. Annes who defeated them 3-12 to 0-7. The club brought two double decker buses of supporters to the final and the Littlepace/Castaheaney area was covered in the colours of green and white the week of the game.

In 2012 the first team reached the semi final of the Parsons Cup losing to Robert Emmets in a replay once again. The first game had ended in a draw after extra time. They  reached the quarter-finals of the Junior D Football Championship, losing to Ballyboughal in Ballyboughal. They had beaten St. Margarets, St. Finians of Newcastle and Whitehall Colmcille before being knocked out. The club fielded a second football team for the 2012 season with Benjy Stephens and George Burke in charge. Their first game was against Clann Mhuire in Naul in Division 10 North County of the league, losing 2-5 to 2-15. They won their first ever game on 31 June beating Man O'War in Man O'War 2-12 to 1-10. The second team competed in a tournament hosted by St. Peregrines and co-organised by Tyrrellstown with Croi Ro Naofa also competing on 18 August. Croi Ro Naofa won the cup and St. Peregrines the shield, defeating Erin Go Bragh in the final.

2013 was a difficult year for football in the club. The club started the season with 2 adult football teams and ended the season with one. Donal Quinn stepped down as manager early in the season. The sole remaining football team were relegated from division 7 and knocked out of the junior D football championship in the first round by Wild Geese.

Benjy Stephens was announced as the new manager of the football team for 2014. The competed in Division 10 North County and the junior E football championship. They failed to progress out of their group in the championship and finished in the bottom half of the league. It was a difficult season with the team rebuilding from the previous season.

With the county board reorganizing the leagues, Erin Go Braghs football team competed in AFL Division 11 North County. George Burke took charge of the team with Pat Murphy coaching. They reached the Junior E football championship semi final, losing to Rosmini Gaels. George Burke took over the running of the team for 2016 with Karl Scanlon coaching. The football team narrowly missed out on a promotion play off place and reached the Junior E football championship semi final losing out to eventual winners Starlights.

The same management team was ratified for the 2017 season in December 2016 with Gerry McGeough taking over from Karl Scanlon mid season.  The team started the 2017 season strongly and were top of the table at the end of June and had also reached the championship semi finals. However a losing streak of four games saw the side once again exit the championship at the semi final stage and slip to fourth in the league ending any hopes of promotion.

Hurling
The club was listed as having a hurling team in 1887 and again in 1921, however there is little or no information on hurling's history in Erin go Bragh. In early September 2005 Erin Go Bragh introduced Hurling and Camogie to the Littlepace/Castaheaney area. A junior hurling team was set up during the summer of 2007 with a view to competing in the 2008 hurling season. The hurling team played their home games at Saint Catherines due to the club's current pitch in Castaheany/Littlepace close proximity to houses in the area. The team was set up and managed by Kevin Kenny and captained by Karl Johnson. The hurling team's first match was a friendly against St Peregrines on 30 September 2007. Their first competitive match was against Civil Service hurling club in Islandbridge (picture below). They finished in 11th position in AHL 8 in 2008 and reached the quarter finals of the Junior E hurling championship losing to eventual runners up St. Josephs OCB in their first season.

In 2009 season the side played Wild Geese in The first ever Gus Warren Challenge Cup. They were defeated in Oldtown 2-5 to 2-9. The team narrowly missed out on a place in the quarter finals of the Junior E Championship. The hurling team finished in 10th position in AHL 8 and 4th in the Eddie Barron Shield which was run on a league format with the top two playing off in a final in 2009.

The hurling team reached the Junior E hurling championship quarter finals again in 2010. The team finished in third position in their group behind Kilmacud Crokes and Skerries Harps. They defeated Clontarf, Raheny and Na Fianna, losing to Kilmacud Crokes and Skerries Harps. They played Setanta hurling club of Ballymun in the quarter finals losing by a point in injury time. Setanta went on to the final losing to Saint Patricks of Palmerstown.

On 20 October the club announced that Willie Doyle and Pat Keenan would be taking charge of the hurling team for the 2011 season. The club was relegated to Division 9 but remained at Junior E level for championship. They reached the quarter finals finishing fourth in their group behind Skerries Harps, Kilmacud Crokes and Castleknock beating Commercials and Na Fianna. They were beaten by Realt Dearg who were later defeated by Kilmacud Crokes in the semi final. The team took part in the Sean Walsh Hurling Tournament on 22 October in Carrick-on-Shannon in Leitrim. The tournament organised by Carrick Hurling Club is in memory of a former player who also played at County level who went missing in Australia. They reached the semi final playing Clonguish GAA of Longford, Ballinamore Seán O'Heslin's of Leitrim in the group stages and St. Vincents of Dublin in the semi final. Both Clonguish and St. Vincents who beat Erin Go Bragh reached the final with Clonguish winning the tournament.

Garreth Dalton was appointed manager for the 2012 season. For the first time in the club's hurling history, the club have progressed to final of the Junior E Hurling Championship. They bet Setanta, Good Counsel, Naomh Mearnog and St. Monicas and losing to Commercials in the group stages. In the quarter final they played Civil Service, their first competitive game rivals, winning 1-13 to 1-8 on 16 August in Hazelbury Park. The hurlers have often made the quarter finals of the championship but failed to progress beyond that stage, 2012 was the first time they have done so. They played fellow Dublin 15 club Castleknock in the semi final winning in Somerton 3-11 to 0-8. On 14 October in O'Toole Park they played St. Marks in their first ever hurling final, losing 3-13 to 4-4. 8 members of the first team who started out in 2007 were part of the squad.

2013 was to be the hurling section of the club most successful season. They once again competed in Division 9 of the league losing only a single game and winning the league. But it wasn't until the last day that they won the league with both Lucan Sarsfields and St. Pats of Palmerstown also in the running. 5 members of the team which started in 2007 were playing or involved in the management of the 2013 winning team. They bet Castleknock in Somerton on 6 October 6–17 to 0-8. In the championship the team was promoted to the D championship after reaching the Junior E championship final in 2012. They reached the quarter finals beating Whitehall Colmcille, Faughs and Clanna Gael/Fontenoy, losing to Naomh Fionnbarra and Skerries Harps in the group stage. They lost to eventual runners ups Castleknocks second team in the quarter finals.

Karl Johnson and John Whelan took over the coaching of the junior hurling team for 2014. They competed in division 8 of the hurling league and the junior D hurling championship. While they failed to progress from the group stages of the championship they went the league unbeaten to win it winning 12 and drawing one.

In 2015 the side maintained their status in Division 7 but were relegated to the Junior E hurling championship. Karl Johnson stepped down as manager at the end of the season.

2016 proved to be the clubs hirling teams toughest since their foundation. A manager for the team could not be found with Karl Johnson managing in a care taker capacity with John Whelan also coaching during the season with Karl Scanlon occasionally stepping in. The team won just a single game in Division 7 and as a result we're relegated to Division 8 for 2017. The team suffered from losing several key players as the season progressed to employment outside of the county and abroad as well as long term injury.  They did however manage to maintain their Junior E hurling championship status.

The club have so far failed to find a coach for the 2017 season with Karl Scanlon stepping in as care taker until one can be found with John Whelan also coaching. The hurling team have once again struggled in 2017 with only a draw to their name in the championship they were relegated to junior F status for 2018 after losing to St Brigids in a relegation play off. In the league narrowly avoided  relegation. 
Karl Scanlon resigned at the end of the season.

Karl Johnson and John Whelan returned for 2018. They retained their status in AHL 8 and won the Junior F hurling championship, the 1st club championship ever for the club beating Fingallians in the final on 18 November in Collinstown Lane 1-14 to 1-6. 7 members of the team were part of the set up that started out in 2007.

Adult Roll of Honour
 Dublin Junior Football League Runners Up 1906
 M. J. Kennedy of Erin go Bragh won the 1919 Dublin County Board Cross Country Novice Race 1919
 Dublin County Board Cross Country Novice Race Winners 1921
 Dublin Junior 'A' Football League Winners 1945
 Dublin Junior Football League Runners Up 1945
 Dublin Minor Football League Winners 1963
 Dublin Minor Division 5 Football League Winners 2005
 Dublin Minor Division 4 Football League Winners 2006
 Gus Warren Challenge Cup (Hurling) Runners Up 2009
 Dublin AFL Div. 8 Runners Up 2011
 Dublin Junior D Football Championship Runners Up
 Dublin Junior E Hurling Championship Runners Up 2012
 Dublin Hurling AHL Division 9 Winners 2013
 Dublin Hurling AHL Division 8 Winners 2014
 Dublin Junior F Hurling Championship Winners 2018
 Dublin AFL Div. 11 North Runners Up 2018
 Mooney Cup (Football) Winners 2018

Inter-county players
Thomas C. Murphy 1907
Stephen Lynch 1907
Henessey 1907
Francis Scully 1908
H Murray (cross country) 1922
H. Callaghan (cross country) 1922
Kevin Larkin (Fingal hurling) 2013

Underage/juvenile
The club is currently coaching over 150 children ranging from 4 to 16 years of age in football, hurling and camogie. A Juvenile Committee was set up to oversee the development of the club's younger players as well as ensuring that the club has the best possible facilities available for their development. Erin Go Bragh with financial support from the Dublin County Board also provide coaching through a Gaelic Games Promotions Officer (and an additional coach through a Community Employment Scheme from 2010 to 2012) during school hours at three primary schools; the Mary Mother of Hope National School , Scoil Benedict, Scoil Grainne and one secondary school Colaiste Pobail Setanta.

St. Catherines
In 2015 Erin Go Bragh joined with Westmanstowns Gaels to form a team at under 15 called Saint Catherines. The amalgamation was expanded in 2018 to see teams field at U14, U15, U16 and minor for football and at U14, U15 and U16 for hurling. The 2019 season will see teams field at U15, U16, and minor for football and U15 and U16 for hurling.

Juvenile committee
Juvenile Chairman: Cecil Stephens
Secretary: Mary McPeake
Member: Benjy Stephens
Member: Finbarr Barrett
Member: Aidan Nolan
Member: Philly Hallisey

Past and present juvenile chairman
Pat Keenan 1986-2007
Niall O'Hara 2007-2009
John McLeod: 2010–2014
Cecil Stephens: 2015–present

Gaelic promotions officers
2006-2008: Clare Dowdall
2008–2010: Michael Aherne
2010-2013: David Needham
2013-: Paul Faughnan

Gaelic Games Coach
2010-2012: Karl Scanlon
2013-2015: James Reilly

Juvenile Roll of Honour
2019 U16 St Catherine's 'D' Championship football winners.
2019 U15 St Catherine's Div.4 football winners.
2018 St Catherine's minor footballers Div.3 North City runners up.
2018 U15 St Catherine's Div.5 football runners up.
2018 U14 St Catherine's Div.5 football winners.
2018 U14 St Catherine's Div.4 feile winners
2017 Under 16 Hurling Shield winners
2016 Under 16 Hurling Championship Runner up
2015 Under 15 Hurling League Division 4 Runners Up
2015 Under 14 Football Feile Division 6 Runners Up
2015 Under 13 Hurling Division 4 Runners Up
2015 Under 12 Hurling Division 5 Runners Up
2014 Under 14 Hurling Division 5 "B" League winners
2014 Under 12 Football League Division 9 Winners
2013 Under 14 Football Feile Division 8
2012 Under 12 Football Division 3 Northside League Winners
2012 Under 11 Football Division 6 North (1 Team) League Winners
2012 Under 11 Hurling Division 6 (1 Team) Runners Up
2012 Under 12 Camaint Tournament Division 4 Runners Up
2011 Under 12 Gaelic Football League North, Division 5B Runners Up
2011 Under 12 Leinster Hurling Tournament Winners
2011 Under 11 Football Division 3 North (1 team) League Runners Up
2011 Under 9 Ger Canavan Annual tournament Runners Up (Div 2)
2010 Under 9 Gormanston Indoor Hurling tournament Runners Up
2009 Under 9 Gormanston Indoor Hurling tournament Winners (Pool B)
2009 Under 9 Gormanston Indoor Hurling tournament Runners Up (Pool C)
2008 Under 8 Gormanston Indoor Hurling tournament Runners up
2008 Under 11 Gaelic Football League Runners up
1989 Under 10 Gaelic Football League Winners

Ladies football and camogie
In 2005 a ladies adult Gaelic football team was set up shortly after the club's relocation to the Littlepace area. The team was managed by Willie Redmond. The ladies football team finished 7th in Division 7 and picked up their first ever competitive wins in both league and championship in 2008. The first underage football and camogie teams were fielded at Under 12 in 2008. The underage section of Erin go Bragh enjoyed a good deal of success in 2008. Erin Go Bragh U12's Camogie team reached the County Championship Final in dramatic fashion with a last minute score against Cuala, however they were beaten by Good Counsel in the final . The Under 12 camogie team were also runners up in Division 2 group 2 league. Four members of the Under 12 camogie tean were selected for the Under 12's Dublin Camogie development squad becoming the first players to be selected for any intercounty team at the club  . In Gaelic football the Under 12 girls team were Division 3 shield runners up to St. Peregrines.

In 2009 the Under 13 girls football team won the Division Three Championship shield.

A separate executive committee was set up in 2010 in order to ensure the development and growth of ladies Gaelic games as both the ladies football and camogie are both administered by separate county boards to the men's games in Dublin. The Under 14 team were runners up in Division 3 of the 2010 camogie league defeating Cuala in a play off. The Under 14s went on to win the Division 4 Championship defeating Ballyboughal in the semi final in Hunters Run, and Thomas Davis in the final on Ballinteer Saint Johns all-weather pitch on 31 October 2010 [15].

Following on their success in 2010, the ladies section expanded in the number of teams taking to the field for the 2011 season. Along with the now Under 15 girls camogie and football team, they also fielded teams at U13 football and camogie and at Under 10. The ladies section also took part in the Gaelic for girls initiative. The Under 15s won their league in 2011. Two girls were also selected on the Under 14 Dublin Ladies Camogie development squad with Kevin Kenny also on the coaching team. The ladies section were awarded small club of the year award by the Dublin ladies Gaelic Football board at their annual awards night in November 2011.

In 2012 the ladies section fielded teams in Under 10,11, 14 and 16 football and Under 11, 14 and 16 Camogie. The Under 14 Camogie team won the Dublin Division 5 Camogie Feile on 27 May defeating Commercials in the Final 0-1 to 0-0 in Parnell Park. The Under 14 Football team reached the Division 5 Championship final. They beat Foxrock–Cabinteely on 22 October in Craobh Chiarans ground Clonshaugh. The Under 16 Football team are in the semi final. The U16 camogie team had to play of against Lucan Sarfields for a spot in the semi final of the C championship. Both teams were level on points after the group stages and Lucan won the playoff. The Under 16s lost to Ballyboden/St. Endas by one point in the C Shield final.

In 2013 the ladies section started an Under 9 team and a girls nursery for 4-7 year olds was also set up. For the second year in a row the Under 14 camogie team won the Division 5 camogie feile beating Setanta in the final. Jessica Carroll and Niamh Padden were selected for the Under 14 Dublin camogie development panel while Alannah Kenny and Saoirse Donohue were selected for the Under 15 Dublin development panel. The Under 15 ladies football team were runners up in the division 4 championship while the camogie team lost to Ballyboden/St. Endas in the Division 4 championship shield final. The ladies minor football team won the Division 4 championship shield beating Castleknock in the final. The minor camogie team reached the final of the Minor Development Shield losing out narrowly to St. Oliver Plunketts/Eoghan Ruadh.

The ladies section fielded adult teams in adult football and camogie in 2014. It will be the first time since 2008 that the club has fielded an adult ladies football team and the first time in the club's history that they will field an adult camogie team. The under 13 ladies football team won the division 4 cup while the under 16 ladies football team won the division 4 shield. The under 13 camogie team were division 5 runners up. The under 16 camogie team won the C championship shield while the under 13 camogie team won the D championship shield. Alannah Kenny and Sorcha Donohue were part of the Dublin under 16B Leinster winning camogie team.

Honours
2015 Under 16 Camogie D Championship Runners Up
2015 Under 14 Camogie D Championship Winners
2015 Under 17 Ladies Football Shield Runners Up
2015 Under 14 Ladies football Division 4 Shield Runners Up
2015 Under 13 Ladies Football Division 3 Runners Up
2014 Under 16 Ladies Football Championship Shield Division 3 Winners
2014 Under 16 Ladies Football League Division 4 Winners
2014 Under 16 Camogie C Championship Shield Winners
2014 Under 13 Ladies Football Division 4 Cup Winners
2014 Under 13 Camogie D Championship Shield Winners
2014 Under 13 Camogie League Division 5 Runners Up
2013 Minor Football Championship Shield Division 4 Winners
2013 Minor Development Camogie Shield Runners Up
2013 Under 15 Ladies Football Championship Division 4 Runners Up
2013 Under 15 Camogie Championship Shield Division 4 Runners Up
2013 Under 14 Camogie Feile Division 5 Winners
2012 Under 14 Gaelic Football Championship Division 5 Winners
2012 Under 14 Camogie Feile Division 5 Winners
2012 Under 16 Camogie C Championship Shield Runners Up
2011 Small Club of the Year
2011 Under 15 Gaelic Football Shield Winners (Division 2)
2011 Under 13 Gaelic Football Shield Runners Up (Division 3)
2011 Under 13 Gaelic Football League Runners Up (Division 4)
2011 Under 15 Gaelic Football League Winners (Division 3)
2010 Under 14 Gaelic Football Championship Winners (Division 4)
2010 Under 14 Camogie League Runners Up (Division 3)
2009 Under 13 Gaelic Football Shield Winners (Division Three)
2008 Under 12 Camogie Championship Runners up (Division 2 Group 2)
2008 Under 12 Camogie League Runners up (Division 2 Group 2)
2008 Under 12 Gaelic Football Shield Runners Up (Division 3)

Executive Committee
Chairperson: Linda Cullen
Secretary: Ronan Behan
Treasurer: David Shakeshaft
Registrar:
Member: Jerry O'Sullivan
Member: Carol Ann Burke
Member: Ciara Farrell
Member: Susan Knight

References

External links
 
New Crest [5]
Erin go Bragh first hurling team: 
Erin go Bragh Under 14 ladies Championship win https://web.archive.org/web/20110721123556/http://www.communityvoice.ie/pages/CV157/CV157s02.htm
Erin go Bragh camogie U 12 Championship final defeat 
Dublin Ladies Gaelic website (Erin go Bragh ladies football team league table and championship progress)
Hill 16 website 2008 league tables football and hurling [Hill 16 website http://www.hill16.ie]
The Gaelic Athletic Association in Dublin 1884-2000 (2005) Editor and compiler: William Nolan Contributors: Jim Wren, Marcus de Búrca, David Gorry 

Gaelic games clubs in Fingal
Gaelic football clubs in Fingal
Hurling clubs in Fingal